Little Caesar is a 1931 American pre-Code crime film distributed by Warner Brothers, directed by Mervyn LeRoy, and starring Edward G. Robinson, Glenda Farrell, and Douglas Fairbanks Jr.   The film tells the story of a hoodlum who ascends the ranks of organized crime until he reaches its upper echelons. The storyline was adapted from the novel of the same name by William R. Burnett. Little Caesar was Robinson's breakthrough role and immediately made him a major film star. The film is often listed as one of the first fully-fledged gangster films and continues to be well received by critics.

In 2000, Little Caesar was included in the annual selection of 25 motion pictures added to the National Film Registry of the Library of Congress being deemed "culturally, historically, or aesthetically significant" and recommended for preservation. The Library of Congress maintains a print.

Plot 
Small-time criminals Caesar Enrico "Rico" Bandello and his friend Joe Massara move to Chicago to seek their fortunes. Rico joins the gang of Sam Vettori, while Joe wants to be a dancer. Olga becomes his dance partner and girlfriend.

Joe tries to drift away from the gang and its activities, but Rico makes him participate in the robbery of the nightclub where he works. Despite orders from underworld overlord "Big Boy" to all his men to avoid bloodshed, Rico guns down crusading crime commissioner Alvin McClure during the robbery, with Joe as an aghast witness.

Rico accuses Sam of becoming soft and seizes control of his organization. Rival boss "Little Arnie" Lorch tries to have Rico killed, but Rico is only grazed. He and his gunmen pay Little Arnie a visit, after which Arnie hastily departs for Detroit. The Big Boy eventually gives Rico control of all of Chicago's Northside.

Rico becomes concerned that Joe knows too much about him. He warns Joe that he must forget about Olga and join him in a life of crime. Rico threatens to kill both Joe and Olga unless he accedes, but Joe refuses to give in. Olga calls Police Sergeant Flaherty and tells him Joe is ready to talk, just before Rico and his henchman Otero come calling. Rico finds, to his surprise, that he is unable to take his friend's life. When Otero tries to do the job himself, Rico wrestles the gun away from him, though not before Joe is wounded. Hearing the shot, Flaherty and another police officer give chase and injure and capture Otero. With information provided by Olga, Flaherty proceeds to crush Rico's organization.

Desperate and alone, Rico "retreats to the gutter from which he sprang." While hiding in a flophouse, he becomes enraged when he learns that Flaherty has called him a coward in the newspaper. He foolishly telephones the police to announce he is coming for him. The call is traced, and he is gunned down by Flaherty behind a billboard – an advertisement featuring dancers Joe and Olga – and, dying, utters his final words, "Mother of mercy, is this the end of Rico?"

Cast 

 Edward G. Robinson as Caesar Enrico "Rico" Bandello / "Little Caesar"
 Douglas Fairbanks Jr. as Joe Massara
 Glenda Farrell as Olga Stassoff
 William Collier Jr. as Tony Passa
 Sidney Blackmer as Big Boy
 Ralph Ince as Pete Montana
 Thomas E. Jackson as Sergeant/Lieutenant Thomas Flaherty 
 Stanley Fields as Sam Vettori
 Maurice Black as Little Arnie Lorch
 George E. Stone as Otero
 Landers Stevens as Alvin McClure - Crime Commissioner

Production 
Clark Gable was sought out for a role in the film, albeit with conflicting perspectives in memoirs; Jack L. Warner said that LeRoy wanted Gable for the lead role, while LeRoy stated that he wanted Gable for the second lead role, but at any rate Warner turned Gable down. Robinson had already played a gangster in plays such as The Racket and The Widow from Chicago (1930), a First National Pictures production.

Reception 

On review aggregator Rotten Tomatoes, Little Caesar holds an approval rating of 92%, based on 25 reviews, and an average rating of 7.4/10. The website's critics consensus reads: "Little Caesar achieves epic stature thanks to Edward G. Robinson's volcanic charisma, forging a template for the big-screen mobster archetype that's yet to be surpassed."

Award and honors 
 4th Academy Awards: Adapted Screenplay ‒ Nominated
 National Film Registry: Selected by the Library of Congress in 2000
 American Film Institute:
 AFI's 100 Years...100 Movies: Nominated in both 1998 and 2007
 AFI's 100 Years...100 Thrills: Nominated
 AFI's 100 Years...100 Heroes and Villains: Rico – #38 villain
 AFI's 100 Years...100 Movie Quotes: "Mother of mercy, is this the end of Rico?"– #73 
 AFI's 10 Top 10: #9 gangster film

Legacy 

Together with The Public Enemy (1931) and Scarface (1932), Little Caesar proved to be influential in developing the gangster film genre, establishing many themes and conventions that have been used since then.

The film's box office success also spawned the production of several successful gangster films, many of which were also made by Warner Brothers. It is listed in the film reference book 1001 Movies You Must See Before You Die, which says "Mervyn LeRoy's Little Caesar helped to define the gangster movie while serving as an allegory of production circumstances because it was produced during the Great Depression— Leavening this theme alongside the demands of social conformity during the early 1930s means that LeRoy's screen classic is far more than the simple sum of its parts."

See also 
 Pre-Code crime films
 History of Pre-Code Hollywood: Crime films

References

External links 

 Little Caeser 1931
  
 
 
 
 
Little Caesar essay by Daniel Eagan in America's Film Legacy: The Authoritative Guide to the Landmark Movies in the National Film Registry, Bloomsbury Academic, 2010 , pages 176-178 

1931 films
1931 crime drama films
American crime drama films
American black-and-white films
1930s English-language films
Films based on American novels
Films based on crime novels
Films based on works by W. R. Burnett
Films directed by Mervyn LeRoy
Films set in Chicago
First National Pictures films
American gangster films
Films about the American Mafia
United States National Film Registry films
Warner Bros. films
Films produced by Hal B. Wallis
Films produced by Darryl F. Zanuck
Films with screenplays by Robert Lord (screenwriter)
1930s American films
Films with screenplays by Francis Edward Faragoh